China Universal Asset Management Co., Ltd. (汇添富基金管理股份有限公司), also known as China Universal or CUAM, is a Chinese investment management company specializing in China-related investment management solutions founded in February 2005. It is headquartered in Shanghai, China, with branch offices in Beijing, Guangzhou, and Chengdu. In 2010 and 2013, China Universal established subsidiaries China Universal Asset Management (Hong Kong) Company Limited and China Universal Capital respectively. The firm's major shareholders are Orient Securities Co., Ltd., Wenhui-Xinmin United Press Group, and China Eastern Airlines.

Products and services of the firm include mutual funds, outbound cross-border funds (QDII), the National Social Securities Fund, e-commerce, advisory services (QFII and domestic), and segregated account services for retail, institutional, and high net-worth clients. The firm's subsidiaries offer inbound cross-border funds (RQFII), Hong-Kong domiciled funds, advisory services (RQFII and QFII), segregated account services, and private equity investments.

See also
 Economy of China

References

External links
 Corporate English Website
 Corporate Chinese Website
 Asian Corporate Governance Association Website
 
Private equity firms of China